Shahabad (also romanized as Shāhābād) is a village in Rivand Rural District, in the Central District of Nishapur County, Razavi Khorasan Province, Iran. At the 2006 census, its population was 14, in 4 families.

References 

Populated places in Nishapur County